Neil Fox may refer to:

Neil Fox (broadcaster) (born 1961), English radio and television presenter
Neil Fox (rugby league) (born 1939), English rugby league footballer
 Neil Fox (cricketer) (born 1962), former English cricketer
Neil Fox (referee), Australian soccer referee